is a 1970 Japanese comedy film directed by Azuma Morisaki. It stars Kiyoshi Atsumi as Kuruma Torajirō (Tora-san), and Michiyo Aratama as his love interest or "Madonna". Tora-san, His Tender Love is the third entry in the popular, long-running Otoko wa Tsurai yo series, and the first of only two in the series not directed by Yoji Yamada.

Synopsis
Tora-san discovers that his family is arranging a marriage for him. He leaves to the countryside where he falls in love with the manager of an inn. Unaware that she is involved with another man, Tora-san confesses his love on a New Year's television program.

Cast
 Kiyoshi Atsumi as Torajiro
 Michiyo Aratama as Oshizu
 Shin Morikawa as Ryūzō Azuma
 Chieko Misaki as Tsune Kuruma (Torajiro's aunt)
 Gin Maeda as Hiroshi Suwa
 Chieko Baisho as Sakura Suwa

Critical appraisal
The German-language site molodezhnaja gives Tora-san, His Tender Love three and a half out of five stars.

Availability
Tora-san, His Tender Love was released theatrically on January 15, 1970. In Japan, the film was released on videotape in 1989 and 1995, and in DVD format in 2000, 2005 and 2008. AnimEigo released the film on DVD in the US along with the other first four films in the Otoko wa Tsurai yo series on November 24, 2009.

References

Bibliography

English

German

Japanese

External links
 Tora-san, His Tender Love at www.tora-san.jp (official site)

1970 films
Films set in Kagoshima Prefecture
Films set in Yokkaichi
1970 comedy films
1970s Japanese-language films
Otoko wa Tsurai yo films
Japanese sequel films
Shochiku films
Films directed by Azuma Morisaki
1970s Japanese films